David Kenneth Rush (January 17, 1910 – December 11, 1994) was a United States Ambassador who helped negotiate the groundbreaking Four-Power Agreement in 1971 that ended the post-war crisis over Berlin.

Early life

Kenneth Rush was born David Kenneth Rush in Walla Walla, Washington, where his parents, from an old Tennessee family, had journeyed during a yearlong tour of the western United States. His father was a farmer in Greenville, Tennessee and his mother a teacher. His father died when he was two years old.
After attending secondary schools in Greenville, Rush worked his way through the University of Tennessee by waiting on tables. He majored in history and was elected into the Phi Beta Kappa. In 1932, he enrolled in Yale Law School, where he edited the law journal and earned an LL.B. degree.

Career

Early career
From 1936-1937, Rush joined the Duke University faculty as an assistant professor and taught law. It was here that he met to-be-President Richard Nixon who was a student at the university. It was the beginning of their enduring friendship. In 1937, Rush accepted an offer to join the Union Carbide and Carbon Corporation with the prospect of an executive position. He became a vice president in 1939 and was named president in 1966.

Political career
Rush resigned from all private positions in 1969 to become United States Ambassador to West Germany. Rush was credited for playing a major role in the successful conclusion of the Four Power Agreement on Berlin between the United States, Britain, Soviet Union, and France after 17 months of negotiations. The agreement ended more than two decades of East-West tensions over the divided former capital of Germany; it improved ties between Washington and Moscow, reaffirmed the Western Allies' rights in the city and paved the way for the development of peaceful relations between East and West Germany.

President Richard Nixon appointed Rush as Deputy Secretary of Defense for 1972 under Melvin Laird, then named him Deputy Secretary of State from February 1973 to May 1974, including a period from September 3 to September 22 when Rush served as interim Secretary of State between the terms of William P. Rogers and Henry Kissinger. On May 25, 1974, he was appointed counselor to the president for economic policy. From 1974 to his retirement on March 15, 1977, he served as Ambassador to France.

Death
Rush died at his home in Delray Beach, Florida on December 11, 1994 at the age of 84. According to one of his sons, he was under treatment for heart and blood ailments.

Personal life

In 1947, Rush married Jane Gilbert Smith. They had five sons and one daughter. Two of their sons died at a young age.

References

External links

 

|-

|-

|-

|-

|-

1910 births
1994 deaths
Ambassadors of the United States to France
Ambassadors of the United States to Germany
Duke University faculty
Florida Republicans
Ford administration cabinet members
Nixon administration cabinet members
North Carolina Republicans
People from Delray Beach, Florida
People from Walla Walla, Washington
United States Deputy Secretaries of Defense
United States Deputy Secretaries of State
Acting United States Secretaries of State
20th-century American diplomats